{{DISPLAYTITLE:C20H23N3}}
The molecular formula C20H23N3 (molar mass: 305.42 g/mol, exact mass: 305.1892 u) may refer to:

 Cianopramine, or 3-cyanoimipramine
 Fezolamine (Win-41,528-2)